Sosyubetsu Dam  is a gravity dam located in Hokkaido Prefecture in Japan. The dam is used for power production. The catchment area of the dam is 192 km2. The dam impounds about 18  ha of land when full and can store 1330 thousand cubic meters of water. The construction of the dam was started on 1958 and completed in 1961.

References

Dams in Hokkaido